Thomas Bantock (1823 – 20 July 1895) was a Scottish-born businessman and politician who served as Mayor of Wolverhampton from 1869 to 1870.

Early life
The son of a gamekeeper he excelled at school in Sutherland and was sent to Wolverhampton as an agent for the Trustees of the Duke of Bridgewater.  By 1861 he was District Agent but also worked for the Great Western Railway.

Thos. Bantock & Co.
He then set up his own business, Thos. Bantock & Co. which grew rapidly. By 1866 he was an ironmaster, mined coal and built boats and wagons.

Politics
Bantock was a Liberal supporter and was elected to the town council in 1861. He was one of the escorts for Queen Victoria during her visit to Wolverhampton to unveil the statue of her late husband, Albert, Prince Consort.

Personal life
He was a member of the Congregational Church. Along with fellow church members he set up Tettenhall College as a school for students from poor families. He was now in a position to move his family into a large mansion, Merridale House, now known as Bantock House. He continued to serve the town, and the church and was a generous benefactor. He died in 1895. In his will, he left the house and land to his son Albert Baldwin Bantock. He is still remembered for his small herd of highland cattle that he kept at Bantock Park, commemorated today in a bronze statue near the house.

References

1823 births
1895 deaths
British ironmasters
Mayors of Wolverhampton
People of the Victorian era
19th-century British businesspeople